George Andre Wells is a Vanuatuan politician and Member of Parliament. He is a member of the National United Party. Wells served as the Foreign Minister of Vanuatu, as well as the Internal Affairs Minister until 2007.

Wells was elected three times Speaker of the Parliament of Vanuatu for terms from September 2008 to June 2009, from January 2010 to December 2010, and from November 2012 to April 2013.

Sworn in as Foreign Affairs Minister 8 December 2010. Wells is the current Minister of Internal Affairs.

References

Living people
Members of the Parliament of Vanuatu
Speakers of the Parliament of Vanuatu
Foreign Ministers of Vanuatu
National United Party (Vanuatu) politicians
Year of birth missing (living people)